German submarine U-273 was a Type VIIC U-boat of Nazi Germany's Kriegsmarine during World War II.

The submarine was laid down on 5 December 1941 at the Bremer Vulkan yard at Bremen-Vegesack as yard number 38, she was launched on 2 September 1942 and commissioned on 21 October under the command of Oberleutnant zur See Hans-Adolf Engel.

Design
German Type VIIC submarines were preceded by the shorter Type VIIB submarines. U-273 had a displacement of  when at the surface and  while submerged. She had two shafts and two  propellers.

U-273 was fitted with five  torpedo tubes (four fitted at the bow and one at the stern), fourteen torpedoes, one  SK C/35 naval gun, 220 rounds, and two twin  C/30 anti-aircraft guns. The boat had a complement of between forty-four and sixty.

Service history
U-273 served with the 8th U-boat Flotilla for training from October 1942 to April 1943, and served operationally with the 9th U-boat Flotilla from 1 May 1943.

U-273 sailed from Kiel under the command of Oblt.z.S. Hermann Rossmann, on 8 May 1943, arriving at Bergen, Norway, on 11 May.

References

Bibliography

External links

German Type VIIC submarines
U-boats commissioned in 1942
U-boats sunk in 1943
U-boats sunk by British aircraft
World War II submarines of Germany
World War II shipwrecks in the Atlantic Ocean
1942 ships
Ships built in Bremen (state)
U-boats sunk by depth charges
Ships lost with all hands
Maritime incidents in May 1943